Our Town is a three-act metatheatrical play created by American playwright Thornton Wilder in 1938. Wilder was awarded the  1938 Pulitzer Prize for Drama for this play. "Our Town" tells the story of the fictional American small town of Grover's Corners between 1901 and 1913 through the everyday lives of its citizens. It is an essential play about how we must embrace and appreciate the value of life itself.

Throughout, Wilder uses metatheatrical devices, setting the play in the actual theatre where it is being performed.  The main character is the stage manager of the theatre who directly addresses the audience, brings in guest lecturers, fields questions from the audience, and fills in playing some of the roles.  The play is performed without a set on a mostly bare stage.  With a few exceptions, the actors mime actions without the use of props.

The first performance of Our Town was at the McCarter Theatre in Princeton, New Jersey on January 22, 1938. It went on to success on Broadway and received the Pulitzer Prize for Drama. Described by Edward Albee it is "the greatest American play ever written". "Our Town" is popular today with frequent revivals.

Synopsis

Act I: Daily Life
The Stage Manager introduces the audience to the small town of Grover's Corners, New Hampshire, and the people living there as a morning begins in the year 1901.  Joe Crowell delivers the paper to Doc Gibbs, Howie Newsome delivers the milk, and the Webb and Gibbs households send their children (Emily and Wally Webb, George and Rebecca Gibbs) off to school on this beautifully simple morning.  Professor Willard speaks to the audience about the history of the town. Editor Webb speaks to the audience about the town's socioeconomic status, political and religious demographics, and the accessibility and proliferation, or lack thereof, of culture and art in Grover's Corners. The Stage Manager leads us through a series of pivotal moments throughout the afternoon and evening, revealing the characters' relationships and challenges. 

It is at this time when we are introduced to Simon Stimson, an organist and choir director at the Congregational Church. We learn from Mrs. Louella Soames that Simon Stimson is an alcoholic when she, Mrs. Gibbs, and Mrs. Webb stop on the corner after choir practice and "gossip like a bunch of old hens," according to Doc Gibbs, discussing Simon's alcoholism. It seems to be a well known fact amongst everyone in town that Simon Stimson has a problem with alcohol; all the characters speak to his issue as if they are aware of it and his having "seen a peck of trouble," a phrase repeated by more than one character throughout the show. While the majority of townsfolk choose to "look the other way," including the town policeman, Constable Warren, it is Mrs. Gibbs who takes Simon's struggles with addiction to heart, and has a conversation with her husband, Doc Gibbs, about Simon's drinking.

Underneath a glowing full moon, Act I ends with siblings George and Rebecca, and Emily gazing out of their respective bedroom windows, enjoying the smell of heliotrope in the "wonderful (or terrible) moonlight," with the self-discovery of Emily and George liking each other, and the realization that they are both straining to grow up in their own way.

The audience is dismissed to the first intermission by the Stage Manager who quips, "That's the end of Act I, folks. You can go and smoke, now. Those that smoke."

Act II: Love and Marriage
Three years have passed, and George and Emily prepare to wed. The day is filled with stress. Howie Newsome is delivering milk in the pouring rain while Si Crowell, younger brother of Joe, laments how George's baseball talents will be squandered. George pays an awkward visit to his soon-to-be in-laws. Here, the Stage Manager interrupts the scene and takes the audience back a year, to the end of Emily and George's junior year. Emily confronts George about his pride, and over an ice cream soda, they discuss the future and  confess their love for each other. George decides not to go to college, as he had planned, but to work and eventually take over his uncle's farm. In the present, George and Emily say that they are not ready to marry—George to his mother, Emily to her father—but they both calm down and happily go through with the wedding.

Act III: Death and Eternity
Nine years have passed. The Stage Manager, in a lengthy monologue, discusses eternity, focusing attention on the cemetery outside of town and the people who have died since the wedding, including Mrs. Gibbs (pneumonia, while traveling), Wally Webb (burst appendix, while camping), Mrs. Soames, and Simon Stimson (suicide by hanging). Town undertaker Joe Stoddard is introduced, as is a young man named Sam Craig who has returned to Grover's Corners for his cousin's funeral. That cousin is Emily, who died giving birth to her and George's second child. Once the funeral ends, Emily emerges to join the dead. Mrs. Gibbs urges her to forget her life, warning her that being able to see but not interact with her family, all the while knowing what will happen in the future, will cause her too much pain. Ignoring the warnings of Simon, Mrs. Soames, and Mrs. Gibbs, Emily returns to Earth to relive one day, her 12th birthday. She joyfully watches her parents and some of the people of her childhood for the first time in years, but her joy quickly turns to pain as she realizes how little people appreciate the simple joys of life. The memory proves too painful for her and she realizes that every moment of life should be treasured. When she asks the Stage Manager if anyone truly understands the value of life while they live it, he responds, "No. The saints and poets, maybe – they do some." Emily returns to her grave next to Mrs. Gibbs and watches impassively as George kneels weeping over her. The Stage Manager concludes the play and wishes the audience a good night.

Characters
 Stage Manager – a narrator, commentator, and guide through Grover's Corners. He joins in the action of the play periodically, as the minister at the wedding, the soda shop owner, a local townsman, etc., and speaks directly to Emily after her death.
 Emily Webb – one of the main characters; we follow her from a precocious young girl through her wedding to George Gibbs and her early death.
 George Gibbs – the other main character; the boy next door, a kind but irresponsible teenager who matures over time and becomes a responsible husband, father and farmer.
 Frank Gibbs – George's father, the town doctor.
 Julia (Hersey) Gibbs –George's mother. She dreams of going to Paris but doesn't get there. She saved $350 for the trip from the sale of an antique furniture piece but willed it to George and Emily. Dies while visiting her daughter in Ohio.
 Charles Webb – Emily's father, Editor of the Grover's Corners Sentinel
 Myrtle Webb – Emily and Wally's mother.
Secondary characters
 Joe and Si Crowell – local paperboys. Joe's intelligence earns him a full scholarship to MIT where he graduates at the top of his class. His promise will be cut short on the fields of France during World War I, according to the Stage Manager. Both he and his brother Si hold marriage in high disdain.
 Simon Stimson – the choir director and church organist. We never learn the specific cause of his alcoholism and suicide, although Joe Stoddard, the undertaker, observes that "He's seen a peck of troubles." He remains bitter and cynical even beyond the grave. Some critics interpret Simon as a closeted homosexual.
 Howie Newsome – the milkman, a fixture of Grover's Corners. 
 Rebecca Gibbs – George's younger sister. Later elopes with a traveling salesman and settles in Ohio.
 Wallace "Wally" Webb – Emily's younger brother. Died of a burst appendix on a Boy Scout camping trip.
 Professor Willard – A rather long-winded lecturer.
 Woman in the Balcony – attendee of Editor Webb's political and social report – concerned with temperance
 Belligerent Man at Back of Auditorium – attendee of Editor Webb's political and social report – concerned with social justice
 Lady in a Box – Attendee of Editor Webb's political and social report – concerned with culture and beauty.
 Mrs. Louella Soames – A gossipy townswoman and member of the choir.
 Constable Bill Warren – The policeman.
 Three Baseball Players – Who mock George at the wedding.
 Joe Stoddard – the undertaker
 Sam Craig – a nephew of Mrs Gibbs who left town to seek his fortune. He came back after 12 years in Buffalo for Emily's funeral.
 Man from among the Dead
 Woman from among the Dead
 Mr. Carter (Dead)
 Farmer McCarty
 Bessie – Howie Newsome's horse. (visible to the characters, but not the audience)

Composition
Wilder began making notes for the play while he was teaching and lecturing in Chicago in the 1930s.  He was constantly on the move, he worked on the play wherever he went. In June 1937, he stayed in the MacDowell Colony in Peterborough, New Hampshire, one of the many locations where he worked on the play. It is believed Wilder drafted the entire third act during a visit to Zürich in September 1937, in one day, after a long evening walk in the rain with a friend, author Samuel Morris Steward.

Wilder explained his vision in writing the play:

”Our Town” is not offered as a picture of life in a New Hampshire village or as a speculation about the condition of life after death. . . .It is an attempt to find a value above all price for the smallest events in our life. I have made the claim as preposterous as possible, for I have set the village against the largest dimension of time and place. The recurrent words in this play (few have noticed it) are “hundreds,” “thousands,” and “millions.”

Setting
The play is set in the actual theatre where the play is being performed, but the date is always May 7, 1901. The Stage Manager of the May 7, 1901, production introduces the play-within-the-play which is set in the fictional community of Grover's Corners, New Hampshire. The Stage Manager gives the coordinates of Grover's Corners as 42°40′ north latitude and 70°37′ west longitude (those coordinates are actually in Massachusetts, about a thousand feet off the coast of Rockport), and at the beginning of Act III he mentions several real New Hampshire landmarks in the vicinity: Mt. Monadnock and the towns of Jaffrey, Jaffrey Center, Peterborough, and Dublin.

Style
In Wilder's writing of Our Town, he employed a metatheatrical style. He utilized the Stage Manager role to narrate the story and also to appear as several different characters. The Stage Manager, as the play's "Narrator", creates the story's point of view. The Narrator is supernatural as he is entirely aware of his relationship with the audience; as such it allows him free to break the fourth wall and address them directly. 

The play's stage direction indicates that the play is to be staged and performed with little scenery, no set, and minimal props. Wilder's reasoning was, ". . .I tried to restore significance to the small details of life by removing the scenery. The spectator through lending his imagination to the action restages it inside his own head. In its healthiest ages, the theatre has always exhibited the least scenery." 

Wilder commented on the sparse stage setting:

Each individual assertion to an absolute reality can only be inner, very inner.  And here the method of staging finds its justification–in the first two acts there are at least a few chairs and tables; but when Emily revisits the earth and the kitchen to which she descended on her twelfth birthday, the very chairs and table are gone. Our claim, our hope, our despair is in the mind–not in things, not in “scenery.” Moliere said that for the theater all he needed was a platform and a passion or two. The climax of this play needs only five square feet of boarding and the passion to know what life means to us.

The characters mime the objects with which they interact. Their surroundings are created only with chairs, tables, staircases, and ladders. For example, the scene in which Emily helps George with his evening homework, conversing through upstairs windows, is performed with the two actors standing atop separate ladders to represent their neighboring houses. Wilder once said: "Our claim, our hope, our despair are in the mind—not in things, not in 'scenery.' "

Wilder called Our Town his favorite out of all his works, but complained that it was rarely done right, insisting that it "should be performed without sentimentality or ponderousness—simply, dryly, and sincerely."

Production history

Our Town was first performed at McCarter Theater in Princeton, New Jersey, on January 22, 1938.

It next opened at the Wilbur Theatre in Boston, on January 25, 1938.

The New York City debut of Our Town was on February 4, 1938, at Henry Miller's Theatre and later moved to the Morosco Theatre, where it ran until November 19, 1938; this production was produced and directed by Jed Harris. Wilder received the Pulitzer Prize for Drama in 1938 for the work. The Jed Harris production of Our Town was revived at New York City Center on January 10, 1944, running for 24 performances until January 29, with Montgomery Clift as George and Martha Scott as Emily.

In 1946, the Soviet Union prevented a production of Our Town in the Russian sector of occupied Berlin "on the grounds that the drama is too depressing and could inspire a German suicide wave".

Victor Carin directed a production by the Edinburgh Gateway Company in 1965.

Henry Fonda played the Stage Manager in a production that ran on Broadway from Nov 27 to Dec 27, 1969. Elizabeth Hartman played Emily and Harvey Evans played George. Margaret Hamilton and Ed Begley were in the cast. 

A production at New York City's Lincoln Center opened on December 4, 1988, after 27 previews and ran for 136 performances until April 2, 1989; the cast included Spalding Gray as "Stage Manager", Frances Conroy as "Mrs. Gibbs", Penelope Ann Miller as "Emily" and Eric Stoltz as "George". The production was videotaped for broadcast on PBS (see "Adaptations" below).

In 2003, Paul Newman, marking his final stage performance, acted in the role of "Stage Manager" with Jayne Atkinson as "Mrs. Gibbs" and Jane Curtin as "Mrs. Webb" in a production staged at New York City's Booth Theatre. It opened on December 4, 2002, after three previews and ran until January 26, 2003. The production was videotaped for broadcast on Showtime and later on PBS (see "Adaptations" below).

An award-winning revival of Our Town opened at the Barrow Street Theatre, in New York City, on February 26, 2009. The production was directed by David Cromer, who also performed the role of Stage Manager for much of the show's run. Upon closing, the production had played four preview and 644 regular performances, making it the longest-running production of the play in its history.  In addition to Cromer, other notable actors who performed in the role of Stage Manager included Helen Hunt, Michael McKean, Jason Butler Harner, Stephen Kunken and Michael Shannon.

In 2017, Tony Award-winning Deaf West Theater, a Los Angeles-based theater company, co-produced with the Pasadena Playhouse a production of Our Town performed in American Sign Language and spoken English.

Awards
 1938 Pulitzer Prize for Drama. On May 2, 1938, Thornton Wilder won the prize of $1,000 "for the original American play. . .which shall represent in marked fashion the educational value and power of the stage, preferably dealing with the American life."
 1989 Drama Desk Award for Outstanding Revival
 1989 Tony Award for Best Revival

Adaptations

 Our Town was first performed on radio May 12, 1939, on The Campbell Playhouse. The cast included Orson Welles as the Stage Manager, John Craven of the original stage production as George Gibbs, and Patricia Newton as Emily Webb.
 Our Town (1940 film), adaptation starring Martha Scott as Emily and William Holden as George Gibbs, with an original music score composed by Aaron Copland. Many members of the original cast repeated their roles in this film, although the ending was changed so that Emily lived.
 Our Town (1940 radio), on May 6, 1940, a radio version was performed by many of the same film actors for Lux Radio Theater.
 Our Town (1946 radio), on September 29, 1946, a radio version was performed on the Theatre Guild on the Air featuring Thornton Wilder himself as the Stage Manager and Dorothy McGuire as Emily.
 In 1953, The Ford 50th Anniversary Show, broadcast live on both the CBS and NBC television networks, featured a scene from Our Town, including performances by Mary Martin and Oscar Hammerstein II. The Ford show attracted an audience of 60 million viewers. Forty years after the broadcast, television critic Tom Shales recalled the broadcast as both "a landmark in television" and "a milestone in the cultural life of the '50s".
 Our Town (television), a live musical 1955 television adaptation on Producers' Showcase starring Frank Sinatra as the Stage Manager, Paul Newman as George Gibbs, and Eva Marie Saint as Emily. The first and only musical version of the play to be telecast. The song "Love and Marriage" was written for this production by Jimmy van Heusen and Sammy Cahn.
 Our Town, a 1977 television adaptation of the play, starring Hal Holbrook as the Stage Manager, Robby Benson as George Gibbs and Glynnis O'Connor as Emily Webb.
 Grover's Corners, a 1987 musical adaptation performed at the Marriott Theatre in Lincolnshire, Illinois.
 Our Town, a 1989 telecast of a Lincoln Center stage production starring Spalding Gray, Frances Conroy, Penelope Ann Miller, and Eric Stoltz
 In 1994, Philip Jerry choreographed a balletic adaptation set to the music of Aaron Copland which the American Repertory Ballet in Princeton, New Jersey, has performed in the decades since its premiere.
 OT: Our Town, a 2002 documentary by Scott Hamilton Kennedy about a production of the play by Dominguez High School in Compton, California
 Our Town, a 2003 television film adaptation starring Paul Newman as the Stage Manager. It was shown on PBS as part of Masterpiece Theatre after first being shown on the cable channel Showtime. It was filmed at the Booth Theatre in Manhattan, where it played on Broadway in 2002.
 Our Town (opera), an operatic version of the play with music by Ned Rorem
 The film Wonder has a reference of the play, but only the beginning and end scenes were seen.
 The style of the play is mimicked in the 2003 Lars Von Trier film Dogville.

References

Further reading

External links

 The Thornton Wilder Society "Teaching Materials"
 Exploring Thornton Wilder's "Our Town" 
 Dramatic and Theatrical Aspects in Thornton Wilder’s “Our Town”
 "Our Town" - Cummings Study Guide'
 "Our Town" - 1940 Black and White Film - at The Internet Archive
 Our Town Plot Summary and Critical Analysis
 In Our Living and Our Dying: "Our Town" in the 21st Century - Short documentation film about "Our Towns" Legacy
 A Film - "Our Town" 2003 Broadway Production Paul Newman as Stage Manager
 A Film - How Thornton Wilder’s Play Speaks to a Changing America and Around the World
 The Lasting Impact of "Our Town" - A segment from CBS News - Sunday Morning
 "Our Town" - 1989 PBS Series - Great Performances
 Shakespeare Hour Episode 51: "Our Town" - A discussion of the staging, motifs, and leitmotifs in the play "Our Town" -  Alan Paul (Director, "Our Town"): Howard Sherman (Author, Another Day’s Begun: Thornton Wilder’s Our Town in the 21st Century); and Craig Wallace (played the role of Mr. Webb in "Our Town")
 

1938 plays
Broadway plays
Drama Desk Award-winning plays
Pulitzer Prize for Drama-winning works
Plays by Thornton Wilder
Tony Award-winning plays
West End plays
Plays set in New Hampshire
Plays set in the 1900s
Plays set in the 1910s
Fiction set in 1901
Fiction set in 1904
Fiction set in 1913
American plays adapted into films
Coward-McCann books